David L. and Sallie Ann Stoutimore House, also known as the Jenkins House, is a historic home located at Plattsburg, Clinton County, Missouri. It was built in 1892, and is a -story, "L"-shaped, Second Empire style frame dwelling on a brick basement.  It has a mansard roof and -story tower nook that projects above the roof.  It features wood quoins, bracketed cornices, and a highly ornamented wraparound porch. Not to be confused with the Sallie House situated in Atchison, Kansas

It was listed on the National Register of Historic Places in 2013.

References

Houses on the National Register of Historic Places in Missouri
Second Empire architecture in Missouri
Houses completed in 1892
Buildings and structures in Clinton County, Missouri
National Register of Historic Places in Clinton County, Missouri